Temamatla is a municipality in the State of Mexico in Mexico. The municipality covers an area of 28.42 km².

As of 2005, the municipality had a total population of 10,135.

References

Municipalities of the State of Mexico
Populated places in the State of Mexico